"Ali Baba and the Forty Thieves" is a folk tale added to the One Thousand and One Nights in the 18th century by its French translator Antoine Galland, who heard it from Syrian storyteller Hanna Diyab. As one of the most popular Arabian Nights tales, it has been widely retold and performed in many media across the world, especially for children (for whom the more violent aspects of the story are often suppressed).

In the original version, Ali Baba is a poor woodcutter and an honest person who discovers the secret of a thieves' den, and enters with the magic phrase "open sesame". The thieves try to kill Ali Baba, but Ali Baba's faithful slave-girl foils their plots. Ali Baba's son marries her and Ali Baba keeps the secret of the treasure.

Textual history
The tale was added to the story collection One Thousand and One Nights by one of its European translators, Antoine Galland, who called his volumes Les Mille et Une Nuits (1704–1717). Galland was an 18th-century French Orientalist who heard it in oral form from a Syrian Maronite story-teller, called Hanna Diyab, who came from Aleppo in modern-day Syria and told the story in Paris. In any case, the earliest known text of the story is Galland's French version. Richard F. Burton included it in the supplemental volumes (rather than the main collection of stories) of his translation (published as The Book of the Thousand Nights and a Night).

The American Orientalist Duncan Black MacDonald discovered an Arabic-language manuscript of the story at the Bodleian Library; however, this was later found to be a counterfeit.

Story
Ali Baba and his older brother, Cassim (sometimes spelled Kasim), are the sons of a merchant. After their father's death, the greedy Cassim marries a wealthy woman and becomes well-to-do, building on their father's business. Ali Baba marries a poor woman and settles into the trade of a woodcutter.

One day, Ali Baba is at work collecting and cutting firewood in the forest, when he happens to overhear a group of 40 thieves visiting their stored treasure. Their treasure is in a cave, the mouth of which is sealed by a huge rock. It opens on the magic words "open sesame" and seals itself on the words "close sesame". When the thieves are gone, Ali Baba enters the cave himself and takes a single bag of gold coins home.

Ali Baba and his wife borrow his sister-in-law's scales to weigh their new wealth. Unbeknownst to them, Cassim's wife puts a blob of wax in the scales to find out what Ali Baba is using them for, as she is curious to know what kind of grain her impoverished brother-in-law needs to measure. To her shock, she finds a gold coin sticking to the scales and tells her husband. Under pressure from his brother, Ali Baba is forced to reveal the secret of the cave. Cassim goes to the cave, taking a donkey with him to take as much treasure as possible. He enters the cave with the magic words. However, in his greed and excitement over the treasure, he forgets the words to get out again and ends up trapped. The thieves find him there and kill him. When his brother does not come back, Ali Baba goes to the cave to look for him, and finds the body quartered and with each piece displayed just inside the cave's entrance, as a warning to anyone else who might try to enter.

Ali Baba brings the body home where he entrusts Morgiana, a clever slave-girl from Cassim's household, with the task of making others believe that Cassim has died a natural death. First, Morgiana purchases medicines from an apothecary, telling him that Cassim is gravely ill. Then, she finds an old tailor known as Baba Mustafa whom she pays, blindfolds, and leads to Cassim's house. There, overnight, the tailor stitches the pieces of Cassim's body back together. Ali Baba and his family are able to give Cassim a proper burial without anyone suspecting anything.

The thieves, finding the body gone, realize that another person must know their secret, and they set out to track him down. One of the thieves goes down to the town and comes across Baba Mustafa, who mentions that he has just sewn the pieces of a corpse back together. Realizing the dead man must have been the thieves' victim, the thief asks Baba Mustafa to lead the way to the house where the deed was performed. The tailor is blindfolded again, and in this state he is able to retrace his steps and find the house. The thief marks the door with a symbol so the other thieves can come back that night and kill everyone in the house. However, the thief has been seen by Morgiana who, loyal to her master, foils the thief's plan by marking all the houses in the neighborhood similarly. When the 40 thieves return that night, they cannot identify the correct house, and their leader kills the unsuccessful thief in a furious rage. The next day, another thief revisits Baba Mustafa and tries again. Only this time, a chunk is chipped out of the stone step at Ali Baba's front door. Again, Morgiana foils the plan by making similar chips in all the other doorsteps, and the second thief is killed for his failure as well. At last, the leader of the thieves goes and looks himself. This time, he memorizes every detail he can of the exterior of Ali Baba's house.

The leader of the thieves pretends to be an oil merchant in need of Ali Baba's hospitality, bringing with him mules loaded with 38 oil jars, one filled with oil, the other 37 hiding the other remaining thieves. Once Ali Baba is asleep, the thieves plan to kill him. Again, Morgiana discovers and foils the plan, killing the 37 thieves in their oil jars by pouring boiling oil on them. When their leader comes to rouse his men, he discovers they are all dead and escapes. The next morning, Morgiana tells Ali Baba about the thieves in the jars. They bury them, and Ali Baba shows his gratitude by giving Morgiana her freedom.

To exact revenge, the leader of the thieves establishes himself as a merchant, befriends Ali Baba's son (who is now in charge of the late Cassim's business), and is invited to dinner at Ali Baba's house. However, the thief is recognized by Morgiana, who performs a sword dance with a dagger for the diners and plunges it into the thief's heart, when he is off his guard. Ali Baba is at first angry with Morgiana, but when he finds out the thief wanted to kill him, he is extremely grateful and rewards Morgiana by marrying her to his son. Ali Baba is then left as the only one knowing the secret of the treasure in the cave and how to access it.

Analysis

Classification
The story has been classified in the Aarne–Thompson-Uther classification system as ATU 954, "The Forty Thieves". The tale type enjoys "almost universal ... diffusion".

Variants
A West African version, named The Password: Outwitting Thieves has been found.

Percy Amaury Talbot located a Nigerian variant, called The Treasure House in the Bush, from Ojong Akpan of Mfamosing.

An American variant was collected by Elsie Clews Parsons from Cape Verde.

In popular culture

Audio recordings and music
Audio readings/dramatizations include:
 Dick Bentley played Ali Baba in a musical dramatization on Riverside Records (RLP 1451)/Golden Wonderland (GW 231).
 The story was dramatized for Tale Spinners for Children on United Artists Records (UAC 11018).
 Anthony Quayle narrated the story on Caedmon Records (TC 1251)/Fontana Records (SFL 14108).
 Martyn Green narrated the story on Arabian Nights' Entertainment (Riverside Records RLP 1405).
 Bing Crosby narrated and sang a version of the story for Simon & Schuster Records (A298:20)/Gala Records (GLP 351).
 Bing Crosby recorded the story on 25 April 1957, linking the narrative with songs. This was issued as an album Ali Baba and the Forty Thieves in 1957.
 "1001 Nights (Alibaba)", a song by Pappy'ion on CBS Records (CBS 7849), mainly known for its Chinese adaptation, "阿里巴巴" by Peter Chen (陳彼得) on TONY東尼機構 Records (TONY LP-026)
 "Main Hoon Alibaba", a song from the 1953 Indian film Char Chand by Talat Mehmood and Premlata, it narrates the adventures of Ali Baba.
 "Alibaba Alibaba", a song by Asha Bhosle from Alibaba Aur 40 Chor, a 1966 Indian film.
 "Main Alibaba" is a song by K. J. Yesudas from Alibaba Marjinaa, a 1977 Indian film adaptation of the folktale.
 "Alibaba Alibaba" is a song about Alibaba and his love for Marjina by Suresh Wadkar and Kavita Krishnamurthy, from the 1982 Indian film Jeeo Aur Jeene Do.
 "Ali Baba Ali Baba" is a song about the woodcutter by Runa Laila and Aadesh Shrivastava from the 1990 Indian film Agneepath.
The second track on "super group" Dark Lotus' album Tales from the Lotus Pod (2001) is titled "Ali Baba".
John Holt sings of the dream he had of Ali Baba in his song titled "Ali Baba".
On the first track on Licensed to Ill, "Rhymin' & Steelin'", the Beastie Boys chant "Ali Baba and the forty thieves".

Books and comics
 Tom Holt's mythopoeic novel Open Sesame is based on characters from the story of Ali Baba and the Forty Thieves.
 In an Alvin comic book (Dell Comics No. 10, Jan.-Mar. 1965), The Chipmunks (Alvin, Theodore, and Simon) join eccentric scientist Dr. Dilby in his time machine. Their first stop is ancient Persia, where they meet Ali Baba and help him fight the 40 Thieves.
 Although not a direct adaptation, the characters of Ali Baba, Cassim, and Morgiana as well as part of the concept of the Forty Thieves are featured in the Japanese manga series Magi. In 2012, this manga was adapted to anime.

Theatre - Stage 

 The story has been used as a popular pantomime plot for many years. An example of the "pantomime Ali Baba" was the pantomime/musical Chu Chin Chow (1916).
 40 Thieves (1886) was a pantomime at the Royal Lyceum Theatre, Edinburgh.
 Ali-Baba (1887) is an opéra comique, with music by Charles Lecocq.
 Badi-Bandar Rupkatha (বাঁদী-বান্দার রূপকথা) is a 2014 Bangladeshi theatrical dance adaption of Ali Baba and Forty Thieves organised by Srishti cultural centre and Nrityanchal. Many leading Bangladeshi dancers performed in the adaption such as Shamim Ara Nipa, Shibli Sadiq, etc.

Theatrical films

Live-action Foreign-language films
 Ali Baba et les quarante voleurs is a 1902 short silent film directed by Ferdinand Zecca, and possibly the first film adaptation.
 Alibaba and the Forty Thieves is a 1927 Indian silent film adaptation by Bhagwati Prasad Mishra.
 Alibaba Aur Chalis Chor (Alibaba and the Forty Thieves) is a 1932 Indian Hindi-language feature film by J.J. Madan.
Alibaba is a 1937 Indian Bengali-language fantasy-comedy film adaptation by Modhu Bose of Kshirode Prasad Vidyavinode's play based on the story of Ali Baba. It stars Bibhuti Ganguly in the titular role, Sadhana Bose as Marjina and Madhu Bose as Abdullah - the antagonist.
Ali Baba is a 1940 Indian Hindi-language fantasy film by Mehboob Khan. The film was a bilingual, made in Punjabi language as Alibaba at the same time. It stars Surendra in a double role as Ali Baba and his son along with Sardar Akhtar, Ghulam Mohammed and Wahidan Bai.
 Alibabavum 40 Thirudargalum (Alibaba and the Forty Thieves) is a 1941 Indian Tamil-language comedy film adaptation by K. S. Mani.
 Ali Baba We El Arbeen Haramy (1942, in aka Ali Baba and the Forty Thieves) is an Egyptian film adaptation, starring Ali Al-Kassar as Ali Baba and the comedian actor Ismail Yasin as his assistant.
 Ali Baba is a 1945 Indian Hindi-language film adaptation by Nanubhai Vakil.
 Ali Baba et les quarante voleurs (1954) is a French film starring Fernandel and Samia Gamal.
 Alibaba Aur 40 Chor (Alibaba and 40 Thieves) is a 1954 Indian Hindi-language fantasy action film directed by Homi Wadi. It stars Mahipal in the titular role and Shakila as his love interest, Marjina.
 Son of Ali Baba is a 1955 Indian Hindi-language fantasy film by Majnu. It follows the adventures of Ali Baba's son.
Alibabavum 40 Thirudargalum (Alibaba and the Forty Thieves) is a 1956 Indian Tamil-language adventure fantasy-drama film by T. R. Sundaram, starring M. G. Ramachandran in the titular role.
Khul Ja Sim Sim (Open Sesame) is a 1956 Indian Hindi-language action film by Nanubhai Vakil, starring Mahipal and Shakila in the lead roles. It starts from when Ali Baba has gained the treasure of the thieves after defeating them but his arrogance grows and he starts using the money for his own pleasure.
Sim Sim Marjeena is a 1958 Indian Hindi-language fantasy film by Naren Dave, starring Helen and Mahipal in the lead roles. It follows the adventures of Ali Baba and Marjeena, who serves as his love interest here. It is a sequel to 1956's Khul Ja Sim Sim.
 Aik Tha Alibaba (There was a Alibaba) is a 1963 Indian Hindi-language action film adaptation by Harbans Singh.
 Sindbad Alibaba and Aladdin is a 1965 Indian Hindi-language musical fantasy-adventure film by Prem Narayan Arora. It features the three most popular characters from the Arabian Nights.
 Ali Baba Bujang Lapok (1960) is a Malaysian comedy film which quite faithfully adhered to the tale's plot details but introduced a number of anachronisms for humour, for example the usage of a truck instead of donkey by Cassim Baba to steal the robbers' loot.
Alibaba Aur 40 Chor (Alibaba and 40 Thieves) is a 1966 Indian Hindi-language adventure-fantasy film by Homi Wadia, starring Sanjeev Kumar in the lead role.
 Ali Baba 40 Dongalu is a 1970 Indian Telugu-language film by B. Vittalacharya. Based on the folktale, it stars N T Rama Rao in the titular role and Jayalalitha as Marjiana.
 Marjina Abdulla is a 1973 Indian Bengali-language musical film adaptation by Dinen Gupta, starring Santosh Dutta as Ali Baba, Mithu Mukherjee as Marjina, Rabi Ghosh as Abdulla (Marjina's brotherly figure) and Utpal Dutt as the chieftain of the robbers.
 Ali Baba ve Kırk Haramiler (1971, in English: Ali Baba and the Forty Thieves) is a Turkish film, starring Sadri Alışık as Ali Baba.
 Alibabayum 41 Kallanmaarum (Alibaba and 41 Thieves) is a 1975 Indian Malayalam-language musical film by J. Sasikumar, starring Prem Nazir as Ali Baba.
 Ali Baba is a 1976 Indian Hindi-language action adventure-fantasy film, based on the folktale, by Mohammed Hussain.
 Alibaba Marjinaa is a 1977 Indian Hindi-language action-adventure film by Kedar Kapoor, starring Prem Krishan as Alibaba and Tamanna as Marjinaa.
Adventures of Ali-Baba and the Forty Thieves is a 1980 Indian-Soviet film based on the folktale, directed by Latif Faiziyev and Umesh Mehra. The film stars Indian actors Dharmendra, Hema Malini and Zeenat Aman alongside Russian, Caucasian and Central Asian actors. The storyline is slightly altered to extend as a long movie. The writers were Shanti Prakash Bakshi and Boris Saakov, the music was scored by musician R.D. Burman, and the Choreographer was P. L. Raj. It was the most successful Indian-Soviet co-production, becoming a success in both India and the Soviet Union.
 新阿里巴巴 (Xin A Li Ba Ba) /New Ali Baba and Forty Thieves is a 1988 Taiwanese Mandarin-language fantasy-comedy directed by Chun-Liang Chen and Ulysses Chun Ouyang starring Chyi Chin as Ali Baba and Eric Tsang as Ali Mama.
 Alibaba Aur 40 Chor (Alibaba and 40 Thieves) is a 2004 Indian Hindi-language action adventure-drama film by Sunil Agnihotri. A modern-day retelling of the folktale, it follows Alibaba (Arbaaz Khan) as he faces off against a local bandit who has been terrorizing his village.

Live-action English-language films
 Ali Baba and the Forty Thieves (1944), remade as The Sword of Ali Baba (1965), reimagines the thieves as freedom fighters against Mongol oppression, and Ali Baba as their leader. Frank Puglia portrayed the character named Cassim in both versions.
 Son of Ali Baba is a 1952 film directed by Kurt Neumann and starring Tony Curtis and Piper Laurie.  Morris Ankrum plays Ali Baba.
 The story of Ali Baba was featured in Inkheart (2008). One of the 40 Thieves, named Farid (played by Rafi Garven), is brought out of the story by Mortimer "Mo" Folchart and ends up becoming his ally.

Animation - USA 
 A Comi Color cartoon, Ali Baba (1936)
 A Popeye cartoon, Popeye the Sailor Meets Ali Baba's Forty Thieves (1937), features Popeye meeting and defeating the titular group and their leader Abu Hassan (portrayed by the same voice actor as Popeye's nemesis Bluto).
 A Merrie Melodies Bugs Bunny/Daffy Duck cartoon, Ali Baba Bunny (1957), has a similar premise to the concept of the treasure-filled magical cave.
 The Disneytoon Studios film DuckTales the Movie: Treasure of the Lost Lamp uses the reference of the folk tale but alters the name of Ali Baba to Collie Baba, the story origins reveals that the DuckTales version of the greatest thief that he stolen the magic lamp from the evil sorcerer name Merlock for good.
In Aladdin and the King of Thieves (1996), the 40 thieves play an integral part in the story. However, the story is very different from the original Ali Baba story, particularly Cassim's new role as Aladdin's father and the King of Thieves, a title which is given to the leader of the Forty Thieves.
In the animated movie Ali Baba and the 40 Thieves-The Lost Scimitar of Arabia (2005), Ali Baba, the son of the Sultan of Arabia, is worried about his father's safety when he discovers that the Sultan's evil brother, Kasim, has taken over the throne and is plotting to kill him. With his friends, Ali returns to Arabia and successfully avoids his uncle's henchmen. Out in the desert, Ali becomes the leader of a group of forty men who are ready to fight against Kasim.

Animation - Europe and Asia 
 Soviet puppet film of the same name directed by Grigory Lomidze, filmed in 1959 at the «Soyuzmultfilm» film studio.
 The story was adapted in the 1971 anime , storyboarded by Hayao Miyazaki.
 Ali Baba is a 1973 Indian Bengali-language musical drama short animated film directed by Rohit Mohra.
Ali Baba appears as a protagonist in the 1975 anime series Arabian Nights: Sinbad's Adventures. This version is portrayed as a young desert raider who befriends Sinbad and accompanies him on his adventures.
 In the manga, Magi: The Labyrinth of Magic (serialized since June 2009), Alibaba appears as another protagonist. At some point in the show, he is shown as the leader of a gang of thieves called Fog Troupe. Morgiana is his loyal friend, whom Alibaba freed from slavery, and Cassim is his friend from the slums, who is constantly jealous of Alibaba and tries to bring him ill fate, when he can.
 Alibaba is a 2002 Indian 3-D animated adventure film by Usha Ganesarajah, produced by Pentamedia Graphics.
 Alibaba and The Forty Thieves is a 2018 Indian 3D-animated film adaptation by V. Murugan.

Television

Live-action
 Indian TV series Alif Laila, based on the Arabian Nights, had a 14 episode segment on Alibaba and the Forty Thieves.
 Princess Dollie Aur Uska Magic Bag (2004–2006), an Indian teen fantasy adventure television series on Star Plus where Vinod Singh portrays Ali Baba, one of the main characters in the show along with Sinbad and Hatim.
 Ali Baba (2007) is a French telefilm starring Gérard Jugnot.
 In the American/British television mini-series Arabian Nights (2000), the story is told faithfully with two major changes. The first is: when Morgiana discovers the thieves in the oil jars, she alerts Ali Baba and, together with a friend, they release the jars on a street with a steep incline that allows the jars to roll down and break open. Furthermore, the city guard is alerted and arrest the disoriented thieves as they emerge from their containers. Later, when Morgiana defeats the thief leader, Ali Baba, who is young and has no children, marries the heroine himself.
In the 2019 BBC/FX adaptation of A Christmas Carol, Ali Baba was portrayed by Kayvan Novak. This was an expansion from a reference to the character in the original novel.
This story was partially used in the 2022 indian fantasy TV series Ali Baba: Dastaan-E-Kabul Aired on Sony SAB, where Sheezan Mohammed Khan played the main character of Ali Baba.

Animation 
 Happily Ever After: Fairy Tales for Every Child televised a "gender bender" version of Ali Baba in 1999, featuring the voices of Jurnee Smollett as a female Ali Baba, Tommy Davidson as Cassim, Marla Gibbs as the Grandmother, Will Ferrell as Mamet the Moocher, George Wallace as Baba Mustafa, and Bruno Kirby as the Great One.
 In The Simpsons episode "Moe Goes from Rags to Riches" (29 January 2012), Lisa is Scheherazade, who tells the story to Nelson Muntz as King Shahryar.
 Elements of Ali Baba were featured in the second Dinosaur King series, from episodes 18 through 21. One of the most common elements of the story featured the 39 Thieves (one of its 40 members was out sick), and it featured the "Open Sesame" phrase.
Adventures of Ali Baba (2018–2019) is an Indian animated television series, produced by Shilpa Shetty Kundra, which aired on Colors Rishtey. A modern-day retelling of the folktale, it follows brothers Ali and Baba, who protect dungeons and fight evil forces with their supernatural powers.

Video games
 Ali Baba (1981) is a computer video game by Quality Software
 Ali Baba and 40 Thieves (1982) is an arcade video game by Sega.
 Blade of Ali Baba is a unique item of the video game Diablo II (2000).
 A version of Ali Baba appears in Sonic and the Secret Rings (2007), where he is portrayed by the character Tails.
 A gang of thieves known as the "Forty Thieves" appears in Sly Cooper: Thieves in Time (2013).
"Alibaba" appears as the hacker alias of Futaba Sakura in Persona 5.
The story Alibaba and the 40 thieves appears on the website Poptropica as a playable island.
 Alibaba and Morgiana were playable characters in the mobile game Grimms Notes, while the 40 thieves and their leader were enemies.
 "Ali Baba's Wee Booties" are a community created weapon for the Demoman in the video game Team Fortress 2 (2007)

Military
At the United States Air Force Academy, Cadet Squadron 40 was originally nicknamed "Ali Baba and the Forty Thieves" before eventually changing its name to the "P-40 Warhawks".

The name "Ali Baba" was often used as derogatory slang by American and Iraqi soldiers and their allies in the Iraq War, to describe individuals suspected of a variety of offenses related to theft and looting. Additionally, British soldiers routinely used the term to refer to Iraqi civilians. In the subsequent occupation, it is used as a general term for the insurgents.

The Iraqis adopted the term "Ali Baba" to describe foreign troops suspected of looting.

Miscellaneous 

 Alibaba Group of China used the name because of its universal appeal.
 Zero-knowledge proofs are often introduced to students of computer science with a pedagogical parable involving "Ali Baba's Cave."

Gallery

Notes

External links

 Ali Baba and the Forty Thieves (e-text, in English, at Bartleby.com)
 Ali Baba and the Forty Thieves at the Internet Movie Database
 Arabian Nights at the Internet Movie Database
 The Sword of Ali Baba at the Internet Movie Database

 
Fictional Arabs
Fictional Iraqi people
Fictional outlaws
Iraq in fiction
Iraqi folklore
One Thousand and One Nights characters
Fictional people from Baghdad
Male characters in fairy tales
ATU 650-699
ATU 850-999